Fedorovskaya is a rural locality (a village) in Pogorelovskoye Rural Settlement, Totemsky  District, Vologda Oblast, Russia. The population was 23 as of 2002.

Geography 
Fedorovskaya is located 62 km southwest of Totma (the district's administrative centre) by road. Yakunikha is the nearest rural locality.

References 

Rural localities in Tarnogsky District